Tournaments include international (FIBA), professional (club) and amateur and collegiate levels.

International tournaments

Men's tournaments
FIBA Basketball World Cup in Spain:
 
 
 
Asian Games in Incheon, South Korea:
 
 
 
Lusophony Games in Goa, India:
 
 
 
South American Games in Santiago, Chile:

Women's tournaments
FIBA World Championship for Women in Turkey:
 
 
 
2014 FIBA 3x3 World Championships in Russia:
 
 
 
Asian Games in Incheon, South Korea:
 
 
 
Lusophony Games in Goa, India:
 
 
 
South American Games in Santiago, Chile:

Junior tournaments

Men's tournaments
FIBA Under-17 World Championship: in Dubai, United Arab Emirates:

Women's tournaments
FIBA Under-17 World Championship for Women: in Czech Republic:
 
 
 
2014 FIBA U18 3x3 Women in Spain:

2014 FIBA Europe youth championships
 20 – 30 August: U-16 European Championship Men Division A in  Ogre, Grobiņa, Liepāja and Riga
 20 – 30 August: U-16 European Championship Men Division B in  Strumica
 30 June – 5 July: U-16 European Championship Men Division C in  Valletta
 24 July – 3 August: U-18 European Championship Men Division A in  Konya
 24 July – 3 August: U-18 European Championship Men Division B in  Sofia
 22 – 27 July: U-18 European Championship Men Division C in  Andorra la Vella
 8 – 20 July: U-20 European Championship Men Division A in  Crete
 10 – 20 July: U-20 European Championship Men Division B in  Sarajevo
 31 July – 10 August: U-16 European Championship Women Division A in  Debrecen
 31 July – 10 August: U-16 European Championship Women Division B in  Tallinn
 30 June – 5 July: U-16 European Championship Women Division C in  Valletta
 17 – 27 July: U-18 European Championship Women Division A in  Matosinhos
 17 – 27 July: U-18 European Championship Women Division B in  Timișoara and Oradea
 22 – 27 July: U-18 European Championship Women Division C in  Andorra la Vella
 3 – 13 July: U-20 European Championship Women Division A in  Udine
 3 – 13 July: U-20 European Championship Women Division B in  Sofia

Drafts 
 2014 NBA draft
First pick in the NBA draft: Andrew Wiggins, University of Kansas, by the Cleveland Cavaliers
 2014 WNBA draft
First pick in the WNBA draft: Chiney Ogwumike, Stanford University, by the Connecticut Sun

Club championships

Continental championships
Men:
Euroleague:  Maccabi Tel Aviv def.  Real Madrid 98–86 (OT)
Euroleague MVP: Sergio Rodríguez, Real Madrid
Euroleague Final Four MVP: Tyrese Rice, Maccabi Tel Aviv
Alphonso Ford Trophy (season's leading scorer): Keith Langford,  Emporio Armani Milano
Eurocup:  Valencia def.  Unics Kazan 165–140 on aggregate
EuroChallenge:  Grissin Bon Reggio Emilia def.  Triumph Lyubertsy 79–65
Americas League:  Flamengo def.  Pinheiros 85–78
Asia Champions Cup:

Women:
EuroLeague Women:
  Galatasaray Odeabank
  Fenerbahçe
  UMMC Ekaterinburg

Transnational championships
Men:
 NBA
Regular season:
 Division champions: 
Atlantic: Toronto Raptors
Central: Indiana Pacers
Northwest: Oklahoma City Thunder
Pacific: Los Angeles Clippers
Southeast: Miami Heat
Southwest: San Antonio Spurs
 Best regular-season record: San Antonio Spurs
 Eastern Conference Finals: Miami Heat def. Indiana Pacers 4–2 
 Western Conference Finals: San Antonio Spurs def. Oklahoma City Thunder 4–2 
 Finals: San Antonio Spurs def. Miami Heat 4–1 for the Spurs' fifth NBA crown. The Spurs' Kawhi Leonard is named Finals MVP.
  National Basketball League, 2013–14 season:
 Premiers: Perth Wildcats
 Champions: Perth Wildcats def. Adelaide 36ers 2−1 
 Adriatic League, 2013–14: Cibona def. Cedevita 72–59
 ASEAN Basketball League, 2014: Hi-Tech Bangkok City def. Westports Malaysia Dragons 2–0
  Balkan League, 2013–14: Levski Sofia def. Hapoel Gilboa Galil 75–69
 Baltic League, 2013–14: Šiauliai def. Prienai 140–123 on aggregate 
 Czech League: 
 VTB United League, 2013–14: CSKA Moscow def. Nizhny Novgorod 3–0

National championships
 Liga Nacional de Básquet, 2013–14:
 Regular season:
 Playoffs:
 Austrian Bundesliga, 2013–14: UBC magnofit Güssing Knights def. ece Bulls Kapfenberg 3–2
 Belarusian Premier League: BC Tsmoki-Minsk def. BK Grodno-93 3–1 
 Basketball League Belgium, 2013–14:  Telenet BC Oostende def. Okapi Aalstar 3–2 
 Bosnia and Herzegovina Championship: 
 Novo Basquete Brasil, 2013–14: Flamengo def. Paulistano 78–73
 Bulgarian National League: Levski Sofia def. Lukoil Academic 3–2 
 National Basketball League of Canada, 2013–14: Windsor Express def. Island Storm 4–3 
 Chinese Basketball Association:
 Regular season: Guangdong Southern Tigers
 Playoffs: Beijing Ducks def. Xinjiang Flying Tigers 4–2
 Croatian League, 2013–14: Cedevita def. Cibona 3–0 
 Liga Nacional de Baloncesto, 2014: Metros de Santiago def Titanes del Distrito Nacional 4–2
 Dutch Basketball League, 2013–14: GasTerra Flames def. SPM Shoeters Den Bosch 4–3
 French Pro A League, 2013–14: Limoges def. Strasbourg 3–0
 Estonian League, 2013–14: Kalev/Cramo def. TÜ/Rock 4–0
 German Bundesliga, 2013–14: FC Bayern Munich def. ALBA Berlin 3–1 
 Greek League, 2013–14: Panathinaikos def. Olympiacos 3–2 
  NBL Indonesia, 2013–14: Aspac Jakarta def. Satria Muda 83–67 
 Iranian Super League, 2013–14: Petrochimi Bandar Imam def. Mahram Tehran 4–1
 Israeli Super League, 2013–14: Maccabi Tel Aviv def. Maccabi Haifa 163−161 on aggregate
 Italian Lega A, 2013–14: EA7 Emporio Armani Milano def. Montepaschi Siena 4−3, ending Montepaschi's streak of league titles at seven. 
 Latvian League, 2013–14:  BK Ventspils def. BK VEF Rīga 4–1 
 Lithuanian LKL, 2013–14: Žalgiris def. Neptūnas 4–2 
 Montenegro League, 2013–14: Budućnost Podgorica def. Zeta 2011 3–2
 Philippine Basketball Association, 2013–14:
Philippine Cup: San Mig Super Coffee Mixers def. Rain or Shine Elasto Painters 4–2
Commissioner's Cup: San Mig Super Coffee Mixers def. Talk 'N Text Tropang Texters 3–1 
Governors' Cup: San Mig Super Coffee Mixers def. Rain or Shine Elasto Painters 3–2
 The Mixers became the first team to win the PBA's Grand Slam (winning all conferences in a season) since the Alaska Milkmen in 1996.
 Polish League, 2013–14: Turów Zgorzelec def. Stelmet Zielona Góra 4–2 
 Portuguese League: Benfica def. Vitória de Guimarães 
 Divizia A: CSU Asesoft Ploiești def. CSM Oradea 3–2 
 League of Serbia, 2013–14: Partizan NIS def. Crvena Zvezda Telekom 3–1
 Slovenian League: Krka def. Olimpija 3–2 
 Spanish ACB:
Season: Real Madrid 
Playoffs: FC Barcelona def. Real Madrid 3–1
 Super Basketball League: Pure-Youth Construction def. Taiwan Mobile Clouded Leopards 4–1
 Turkish League, 2013–14: Fenerbahçe Ülker def. Galatasaray Liv Hospital 4–3
 Ukrainian SuperLeague, 2013–14:  Khimik def. Budivelnyk 3–1 
 British Basketball League, 2013–14: Worcester Wolves
Season:Newcastle Eagles 
Playoffs: Worcester Wolves def. Newcastle Eagles 90–78

Women:
 WNBA
Season:
 Eastern Conference: Chicago Sky (best regular-season record: Atlanta Dream)
 Western Conference: Phoenix Mercury (also best regular-season record overall)
 Finals: The Mercury sweep the Sky 3–0 in the best-of-5 series, claiming their third title. Diana Taurasi of the Mercury is named Finals MVP.

College
Men
 NCAA
Division I: Connecticut Huskies def. Kentucky Wildcats 60–54
Most Outstanding Player: Shabazz Napier, Connecticut 
National Invitation Tournament: Minnesota Golden Gophers def. SMU Mustangs 65–63
College Basketball Invitational: Siena Saints def. Fresno State Bulldogs 2–1 in best-of-3 final series
CollegeInsider.com Tournament: Murray State Racers def. Yale Bulldogs 65–57
Division II: Central Missouri Mules def. West Liberty Hilltoppers 84–77
Division III: Wisconsin–Whitewater Warhawks def. Williams Ephs 75–73
 NAIA
NAIA Division I: Vanguard def. Emmanuel 70–65
NAIA Division II: Indiana Wesleyan def Midland University 78–68
 NJCAA
Division I: Jones County def. Indian Hills 87–77
Division II: Phoenix def. Essex County 71-67
Division III: Rock Valley def. Caldwell 79-69
 CIS Men's: Carleton Ravens def. Ottawa Gee-Gees 79–67 
  UAAP Men's: National University def. Far Eastern University 2–1 in best-of-3 final series. NU wins their first title since 1954.
 NCAA (Philippines) Seniors': San Beda College def. Arellano University 2–0 in best-of-3 final series
 National Championship: San Beda College def. De La Salle University 2–0 in best-of-3 final series

Women
 NCAA
Division I: : Connecticut Huskies def. Notre Dame Fighting Irish 79–58
 Most Outstanding Player: Breanna Stewart, Connecticut
WNIT: Rutgers Scarlet Knights def. UTEP Lady Miners 56–54
Women's Basketball Invitational:
Division II: Bentley Falcons def. West Texas A&M Buffaloes 73–65
Division III: FDU–Florham Devils def.Whitman Missionaries 80–72
 NAIA
NAIA Division I:
NAIA Division II:
 NJCAA
Division I: Trinity Valley Community College 65, Hutchinson Community College 46
Division II: Mesa Community College 82, Highland Community College 72
Division III: Northland Community and Technical College 69, Rock Valley College 60
 UAAP Women's: National University def. Far Eastern University in two games. NU finished with a 16–0 perfect season.

Prep
 USA Today Boys Basketball Ranking #1:
 USA Today Girls Basketball Ranking #1:
 NCAA (Philippines) Juniors: San Beda College-Rizal def. Malayan Science High School 2–0 in best-of-3 final series
 UAAP Juniors:

Notable events 
 On February 1, David Stern retired after being the commissioner of the NBA for 30 years. Adam Silver became his successor.
 On May 7, FIBA lifted the suspension of the Lebanese Basketball Federation in place since mid-2013, thereby allowing the country to participate in international basketball competitions once again.
 On August 5, the NBA's San Antonio Spurs announced that Becky Hammon would be hired as an assistant coach immediately after her retirement as a player at the end of the 2014 WNBA season. Hammon became the first full-time female coach in any of the four major U.S. professional leagues.
 On August 15, Sim Bhullar, a 7'5"/2.26 m Canadian center out of New Mexico State, became the first player of Indian descent to sign a contract with an NBA team. Bhullar signed a non-guaranteed rookie deal with the Sacramento Kings, a franchise whose majority owner, Vivek Ranadivé, is India-born.
 On November 26, FIBA suspended the Japan Basketball Association over the JBA's failure to merge the bj League and the National Basketball League. FIBA forbids a country from having two primary basketball competitions.

Awards and honors

Naismith Memorial Basketball Hall of Fame 
 Class of 2014:
 Players: Šarūnas Marčiulionis, Alonzo Mourning, Mitch Richmond, Guy Rodgers
 Coaches: Bobby "Slick" Leonard, Nolan Richardson, Gary Williams
 Contributors: Nathaniel "Sweetwater" Clifton, David Stern
 Team: Immaculata College (1972–1974 women's team)

Women's Basketball Hall of Fame
Class of 2014
 Lin Dunn
 Michelle Edwards
 Mimi Griffin
 Yolanda Griffith
 Jasmina Perazic
 Charlotte West

Professional

North America
 Men (NBA)
 Bill Russell NBA Finals Most Valuable Player Award: Kawhi Leonard, San Antonio Spurs
 NBA All-Star Game MVP: Kyrie Irving, Cleveland Cavaliers
 NBA Most Valuable Player Award: Kevin Durant, Oklahoma City Thunder
 NBA Rookie of the Year Award: Michael Carter-Williams, Philadelphia 76ers
 NBA Defensive Player of the Year Award: Joakim Noah, Chicago Bulls
 NBA Sixth Man of the Year Award: Jamal Crawford, Los Angeles Clippers
 NBA Most Improved Player Award: Goran Dragić, Phoenix Suns
 NBA Sportsmanship Award: Mike Conley, Jr., Memphis Grizzlies
 NBA Coach of the Year Award: Gregg Popovich, San Antonio Spurs
 J. Walter Kennedy Citizenship Award: Luol Deng, Cleveland Cavaliers
 Twyman–Stokes Teammate of the Year Award: Shane Battier, Miami Heat
 NBA Executive of the Year Award: R. C. Buford, San Antonio Spurs
 Women (WNBA)
 WNBA Most Valuable Player Award: Maya Moore, Minnesota Lynx
 WNBA Defensive Player of the Year Award: Brittney Griner, Phoenix Mercury
 WNBA Rookie of the Year Award: Chiney Ogwumike, Connecticut Sun
 WNBA Sixth Woman of the Year Award: Allie Quigley, Chicago Sky
 WNBA Most Improved Player Award: Skylar Diggins, Tulsa Shock
 Kim Perrot Sportsmanship Award: Becky Hammon, San Antonio Stars
 WNBA Coach of the Year Award: Sandy Brondello, Phoenix Mercury
 WNBA All-Star Game MVP: Shoni Schimmel, Atlanta Dream
WNBA Finals Most Valuable Player Award: Diana Taurasi, Phoenix Mercury

Europe
 Men
 FIBA Europe Player of the Year Award: Tony Parker,  and  San Antonio Spurs
 Euroscar Award:
 Mr. Europa:
 Women:
 FIBA Europe Player of the Year Award:

Collegiate 
 Combined
Legends of Coaching Award: Bill Self, Kansas
 Men
Associated Press College Basketball Coach of the Year: Gregg Marshall, Wichita State
Associated Press College Basketball Player of the Year: Doug McDermott, Creighton
Frances Pomeroy Naismith Award: Russ Smith, Louisville
John R. Wooden Award: Doug McDermott, Creighton
Naismith College Coach of the Year: Gregg Marshall, Wichita State
USBWA National Freshman of the Year: Jabari Parker, Duke
 Women
Associated Press College Basketball Coach of the Year: Muffet McGraw, Notre Dame
Associated Press Women's College Basketball Player of the Year: Breanna Stewart, Connecticut
Carol Eckman Award: Jane Albright, UNLV
Frances Pomeroy Naismith Award: Odyssey Sims, Baylor
John R. Wooden Award: Chiney Ogwumike, Stanford
Kay Yow Award: Kristy Curry, Alabama
Senior CLASS Award: Stefanie Dolson, Connecticut
Basketball Academic All-America Team: Chiney Ogwumike, Stanford
Maggie Dixon Award: Billi Godsey, Iona
Naismith College Coach of the Year: Muffet McGraw, Notre Dame
Naismith College Player of the Year: Breanna Stewart, Connecticut
Nancy Lieberman Award: Odyssey Sims, Baylor
NCAA basketball tournament Most Outstanding Player: Breanna Stewart, Connecticut
USBWA National Freshman of the Year: Diamond DeShields, North Carolina
Wade Trophy: Odyssey Sims, Baylor

Deaths
January 11 — Dick Miller, American NBA player (Indiana Pacers, Utah Jazz) (born 1958)
January 13 — Don Asmonga, NBA player (Baltimore Bullets) (born 1928)
January 13 — Bennie Lands, Canadian Olympic player (1948) (born 1921)
January 21 — Dick Shrider, American NBA player (New York Knicks) and college coach (Miami Redskins) (born 1923)
January 23 — Lew Massey, American college (Charlotte 49ers) and PBA player (born 1956)
January 25 — Dave Strack, American college coach (Michigan Wolverines) (born 1923)
January 26 — Tom Gola, American Naismith Hall of Fame player (born 1933)
January 29 — Vytautas Norkus, Lithuanian-born American player, EuroBasket winner (1939) (born 1921)
February 7 — Murray Mendenhall, Jr., American NBL player (Anderson Packers) and high school coach (born 1925)
February 8 — Keith Hughes, American college (Rutgers Scarlet Knights) and professional player (born 1968)
February 10 — Betty Jaynes, American Women's Basketball Hall of Fame member and college coach (James Madison Dukes) (born 1945)
February 15 — Jim Lacy, American college player (Loyola Greyhounds), NCAA leading scorer in 1947 (born 1926)
February 16 — Charlie Kraak, American college player, NCAA champion at Indiana (1953) (born 1932)
February 16 — Rich Peek, American ABA player (Dallas Chaparrals) (born 1944)
February 18 — Cob Jarvis, American college coach (Ole Miss Rebels) (born 1932)
February 21 — Eddie O'Brien, American college player (Seattle Chieftains) (born 1930)
February 23 — Ely Capacio, Filipino player, coach and PBA executive (born 1955)
February 27 — Terry Rand, American college player (Marquette Warriors) (born 1934)
March 10 — Rob Williams, American NBA player (Denver Nuggets) (born 1961)
March 12 — Wil Jones, American college coach (District of Columbia, Norfolk State) (born 1938)
March 14 — Sam Lacey, American NBA player (Cincinnati Royals) (born 1948)
March 21 — Jim Brasco, American NBA player (Syracuse Nationals, Milwaukee Hawks) (born 1931)
March 23 — Bobby Croft, Canadian ABA player (Texas Chaparrals, Kentucky Colonels) (born 1946)
April 7 — Royce Waltman, American college coach (Indiana State Sycamores) (born 1942)
April 11 — Zander Hollander, American sportswriter (Pro Basketball Handbooks) (born 1923)
April 11 — Lou Hudson, American NBA player (Atlanta Hawks, Los Angeles Lakers) (born 1944)
April 14 — Joe Curl, American women's basketball coach (Houston Cougars) (born 1954)
April 21 — Weldon Kern, American college player, two-time NCAA champion at Oklahoma A&M (1945, 1946) (born 1923)
April 21 — Bill Klucas, American college (Milwaukee Panthers) and professional coach (born 1941)
April 27 — Marlbert Pradd, American ABA player (New Orleans Buccaneers) (born 1944)
April 27 — Turhan Tezol, Turkish Olympic player (1952) (born 1932)
April 28 — Jack Ramsay, American Naismith Hall of Fame coach (born 1925)
May 6 — Billy Harrell, American college player (Siena Saints) (born 1928)
May 8 — Harry Weltman, American ABA (Spirits of St. Louis) and NBA (Cleveland Cavaliers, New Jersey Nets) executive (born 1933)
May 18 — Don Meyer, American college basketball coach (Northern State, Hamline, Lipscomb) (born 1944)
May 28 — Bob Houbregs, Canadian Hall of Fame player (born 1932)
May 31 — Lewis Katz, American NBA team owner (New Jersey Nets) (born 1942)
June 7 — E. W. Foy, American college coach (Southeastern Louisiana, McNeese State) (born 1937)
June 26 — Lidia Alexeyeva, Russian Naismith Hall of Fame women's basketball coach (born 1924)
June 30 — Ed Messbarger, American college coach (Saint Mary's (Texas), Angelo State) (born 1932)
July 5 — Robert Jeangerard, American Olympic gold medalist (1956) (born 1933)
July 11 — Bill McGill, American NBA and ABA player (born 1939)
July 12 — Red Klotz, NBA player and Washington Generals founder (born 1921)
July 24 — Dale Schlueter, NBA player (born 1945)
July 27 — Wallace Jones, NBA player (Indianapolis Olympians) and Olympic Gold Medalist (1948) (born 1926)
August 14 — John Cinicola, American college coach (Duquesne) (born 1929)
August 19 — George Munroe, American NBA player (St. Louis Bombers, Boston Celtics) (born 1922)
August 25 —Bob Warren, American ABA player (born 1946)
August 26 — Bob Wilson, American NBA player (Milwaukee Hawks) (born 1926)
August 28 — Jack Kraft, American college coach (Villanova, Rhode Island) (born 1922)
August 29 —Kurt Bachmann, Filipino Olympic player (1960) (born 1936)
September 1 — Dillard Crocker, American BAA and NBA player (born 1925)
September 1 — Jim Jennings, American college player (Murray State Racers) (born 1941)
September 4 — Martynas Andriukaitis, Lithuanian player (born 1981)
September 7 — Jack Cristil, American radio announcer (Mississippi State Bulldogs) (born 1925)
September 7 —Maryna Doroshenko, Ukrainian women's national team member (born 1981)
September 8 — Marvin Barnes, American NBA and ABA player but is best known for collegiate career at Providence (born 1952)
September 12 — Lonnie Lynn, American ABA player (Pittsburgh Pipers) (born 1943)
September 13 — Paul Valenti, American college coach (Oregon State Beavers) (born 1920)
September 19 — Bill Detrick, American college coach (Central Connecticut Blue Devils) (born 1927)
September 21 — Caldwell Jones, American ABA, NBA player (born 1950)
September 21 — Ed Koffenberger, American college All-American (Duke Blue Devils) (born 1926)
September 22 — Jason Rabedeaux, American college (UTEP Miners) and professional coach (born 1965)
September 23 — A. W. Davis, American college player (Tennessee Volunteers) (born 1943)
September 23 — Robin Freeman, American college player (Ohio State Buckeyes) (born 1934)
September 28 — Roy Ebron, American ABA player (Utah Stars) (born 1951)
October 1 — Charlie Paulk, American NBA player (born 1946)
October 6 — Bill Campbell, American sportscaster (Philadelphia Warriors, Philadelphia 76ers) (born 1923)
October 10 — Lari Ketner, American NBA player (born 1977)
October 11 — Tanhum Cohen-Mintz, Israeli basketball player (Maccabi Tel Aviv) (born 1939)
October 16 — Seppo Kuusela, Finnish player (born 1934)
October 27 — Bob Kenney, American NCAA (Kansas 1952) and Olympic (1952) champion (born 1931)
October 27 — Dan Peters, American college coach (Youngstown State) (born 1954)
October 28 — Jim Paxson, Sr., American NBA player (Minneapolis Lakers, Cincinnati Royals) (born 1932)
November 2 — Jesse Branson, American NBA (Philadelphia 76ers) and ABA (New Orleans Buccaneers) player. (born 1942)
November 8 — Ernie Vandeweghe, American NBA player (New York Knicks) (born 1928)
November 22 — Don Grate, American NBA player (Sheboygan Red Skins) (born 1923)
November 23 — Bob Gottlieb, American college coach (Jacksonville, Milwaukee)
November 26 — Don Dee, American ABA player (Indiana Pacers), Olympic champion (1968) (born 1943)
December 1 — Aleksandar Petrović, Serbian coach (born 1959)
December 2 — Josie Cichockyj, British wheelchair basketball player (born 1964)
December 14 — Doug Martin, American college coach (South Dakota, Dakota Wesleyan) (born 1936)
December 20 — George Fisher, American college coach (Austin Peay)
December 21 — Frank Truitt, American college coach (LSU, Kent State) (born 1925)
December 21 — Paul Walther, American NBA player (born 1927)
December 22 — Nate Fox, American player (born 1977)
December 24 — Robert Hall, Harlem Globetrotters player (born 1927)

See also
 Timeline of women's basketball

References